Kübra İmren Siyahdemir (born 21 June 1986) is a Turkish professional basketball player who played for Tarsus Belediyesi in 2010-11 season and transferred to Turkish Women's Basketball League champion Fenerbahçe Istanbul.

Honors
  Galatasaray
Turkish Presidents Cup: 2008
  Fenerbahçe
Turkish Championship: 2011-12, 2012-13
Turkish Presidents Cup: 2014
Turkish Cup: 2015

See also
 Turkish women in sports

External links
Profile at tbl.org.tr

References

1986 births
Living people
Fenerbahçe women's basketball players
Galatasaray S.K. (women's basketball) players
Migrosspor basketball players
Panküp TED Kayseri Koleji basketball players
Sportspeople from İzmit
Turkish women's basketball players
Small forwards
21st-century Turkish women